The Great Seal of the State of Michigan depicts the coat of arms of the U.S. state of Michigan on a light blue field. On the dark blue shield the Sun rises over a lake and peninsula, a man holding a long gun with a raised hand represents peace and the ability to defend his rights. The elk and moose are symbols of Michigan, while the bald eagle represents the United States.

The design features three Latin mottos. From top to bottom they are:
On the red ribbon: , "Out of many, one", a motto of the United States
On the blue shield: , "I will defend"
On the white ribbon: , "If you seek a pleasant peninsula, look about you," which is the official state motto. It was adopted in 1835 and said to have been suggested by the tribute to architect Christopher Wren at Saint Paul's Cathedral in London, which reads  (Latin "If you seek [his] monument, look around you").

This seal was adopted in the year of 1835, on June 22.

Public Act 19 of 1963 states that "The great seal shall be  the coat of arms of the state around which shall appear the words 'great seal of the state of Michigan, A.D. MDCCCXXXV'."

Coat of arms of Michigan

Legally distinct from, but adopted simultaneously alongside the Great Seal in 1835, is the Coat of arms of Michigan. The current rendition of the Coat of Arms was adopted by the Legislature in 1911 (MCL 2.21). It is identical to the Great Seal of Michigan with the legend or circle, "The Great Seal of the State of Michigan, A.D. MDCCCXXXV", omitted. Unlike the Great Seal, the Coat of Arms may be printed on documents, stationery, or ornaments with no design or words and disconnected with any advertisement (MCL 750.247). However, a person who improperly exhibits and displays the Coat of Arms is guilty of a misdemeanor (MCL 750.245).

Government seals of Michigan

See also

Flag of Michigan
List of Michigan state symbols

References

External links

Michigan Secretary of State: History of the Great Seal

Michigan
Symbols of Michigan
Official seals of places in Michigan
Michigan
Michigan
Michigan
Michigan
Michigan
Michigan
Michigan